Choi Young-jeon (born 3 March 1981) is a South Korean sport shooter.

He participated at the 2018 ISSF World Shooting Championships, winning a medal.

References

External links

Living people
1981 births
South Korean male sport shooters
ISSF rifle shooters
Shooters at the 2018 Asian Games
Medalists at the 2018 Asian Games
Asian Games gold medalists for South Korea
Asian Games medalists in shooting
20th-century South Korean people
21st-century South Korean people